is a Japanese actress and voice actress who was affiliated with Three Tree Productions and Max Mix.

Filmography

Anime

Video games

Other
 Yotekku radio program – Interim host – replacing Natsuko Kuwatani
 Pun-Colle ~voice actresses' legendary punk songs collection (2009) – "Blitzkrieg Bop" by Ramones

References

External links
  
 Official agency profile 
 Kaori Shimizu at GamePlaza -Haruka- Voice Artist DataBase 
 Kaori Shimizu at Hitoshi Doi's Seiyuu Database
 
 

1983 births
Living people
Japanese child actresses
Japanese film actresses
Japanese television actresses
Japanese video game actresses
Japanese voice actresses
Voice actresses from Tokyo
20th-century Japanese actresses
21st-century Japanese actresses